Frank McMahon was an Australian poet born in Loxton, South Australia in 1926 who died on 4 October 2010. He published two books of poetry: Tide Pools and The Asphalt and the Stars. He won several Australian awards for poetry, including "The Bronze Swagman". Frank wrote works commissioned by the Australian War Memorial in Canberra, including an inscription on a granite slab at the new Parliament House in Canberra and a haiku used in the War Memorial's exhibits. His work has been published by his family at http://www.frankmcmahon.org

References

 

1926 births
2010 deaths
20th-century Australian poets
Australian male poets
20th-century Australian male writers